Thomas Cornelius Parker (18 August 1883 – 24 March 1965) was an Australian rower who competed at the 1912 Summer Olympics.

Parker rowed for the Balmain Rowing Club. In 1911  he rowed at four in the New South Wales crew which won the men's eight at the annual Australian Interstate Regatta.

In 1912 he was a member of the Australian men's eight which racing as a Sydney Rowing Club entrant, won the Grand Challenge Cup on the River Thames at the Henley Royal Regatta. The eight then moved to Stockholm for the 1912 Summer Olympics, where after beating a Swedish eight in the first round they were beaten by a Great British crew in the second round - the same Leander eight they had beaten at Henley a few weeks earlier.

In 1913 Parker moved into the ranks of professional rowing.

References

1883 births
Australian male rowers
Olympic rowers of Australasia
Rowers at the 1912 Summer Olympics
1965 deaths